Ploshchad Revolyutsii is a station on the Moscow Metro, in the Tverskoy District of central Moscow. The station is named after Revolution Square (Resurrection Square until 1918), under which it is located. It is on the Arbatsko-Pokrovskaya Line.

History
When the Arbatsko-Pokrovskaya Line was first built, the tracks from Ploshchad Revolyutsii extended westward to Aleksandrovsky Sad rather than Arbatskaya. When the westward extension of the line was completed in 1953, trains were rerouted through the new segment.

Architecture
The station opened in 1938, its architect was Alexey Dushkin. The station features red and yellow marble arches resting on low pylons faced with black Armenian marble. The spaces between the arches are partially filled by decorative ventilation grilles and ceiling tracery.

Sculptures 
The station contains 76 statues in the socialist realism style. Originally, 80 sculptures were created for the space—10 pairs, each replicated 4 times throughout the station. Today, nine pairs are in the archways, and a copy of the final pair ("The Pioneers") appears on each of the two platforms, bringing the total number of statues to 76. Each arch is flanked by a pair of bronze sculptures by Matvey Manizer depicting the people of the Soviet Union, including soldiers, farmers, athletes, writers, aviators, industrial workers, and schoolchildren. The series is meant to be considered in order, symbolizing Russia's transformation from the pre-revolutionary past, through the revolution, into the (then) contemporary era. The order of sculpture pairs are:
 Male worker-partisan & male enlisted soldier
 Male agricultural laborer & male sailor with pistol
 Male sailor & female aviator
 Male soldier with dog & female sharpshooter
 Male miner & male engineer
 Male & female agricultural laborers
 Female & male students
 Male football player & female athlete
 Mother & father in swim clothing
 Male & female students in Young Pioneers uniforms
Several of the sculptures are widely believed to bring good luck to those who rub them. The practice is targeted at specific areas on individual sculptures, including the soldier's pistol, the patrolman's dog, the roosters, and the female student's shoe. An observer in the station will see numerous passengers touching or rubbing the statues as they pass, and the bronze of these details is highly polished as a result.

Transfers
From this station, passengers can transfer to Teatralnaya on the Zamoskvoretskaya Line and Okhotny Ryad on the Sokolnicheskaya Line, but the latter can be reached only through Teatralnaya as there is no direct transfer.

References

External links

metro.ru: official Ploshchad Revolyutsii website 
mymetro.ru
KartaMetro.info — Station location and exits on map of Moscow 

Moscow Metro stations
Arbatsko-Pokrovskaya Line
Public art in Russia
Tverskoy District
Railway stations in Russia opened in 1938
Railway stations located underground in Russia